The Tāmraśāṭīya (Sanskrit: ताम्रशाटीय), also called Tāmraparṇīya (Sanskrit; Pali: Tambapaṇṇiya) was one of the early schools of Buddhism and a branch of the Vibhajyavāda school based in Sri Lanka. It is thought that the Theravāda tradition has its origins in this school. 

Its sutras were written mainly in Pali; and the Pali canon of Buddhism largely borrowed from this school. The Tāmraśāṭīya is also known as the Southern transmission or Mahaviharavasin tradition. This contrasts with Sarvastivada or the 'Northern transmission', which was mostly written in Sanskrit and translated into Chinese and Tibetic languages. 

The Tamrashatiya tradition developed into Theravada Buddhism and spread into Myanmar, Thailand, and other parts of Southeast Asia.

Etymology
Several etymologies are given for the name of this school. 

Tāmra is a Sanskrit term referring to the color of red copper, describing the color of the monks' robes. Based on the standard Chinese translation of the term, it has also been suggested that "copper" refers to copper plates on which the Tripitaka was written.

Tāmraparṇi was also an old name for Sri Lanka, and the origin of the Greek equivalent Taprobana, possibly referring to the monks who established Buddhism here.

Branches
The Tāmraśāṭīya school was established in modern-day Sri Lanka in the city of Anuradhapura, but also remained active in Andhra and other parts of South India, such as Vanavasa in modern Karnataka, and later across South-East Asia. 

The school survived in Sri Lanka and established three main branches:

Mahāvihāra, thought to be the origins of the Theravāda
Abhayagiri Vihāra, branched from the Mahāvihāra in the first century BC and incorporated Mahāyāna and Vajrayāna doctrine
Jetavana Vihāra, branched from the Abhayagiri Vihāra in the third century. 

According to the Mahavamsa the latter two traditions were suppressed and destroyed after the Mahāvihāra tradition gained political power.

See also 
 Vibhajyavāda
 Sarvastivada
Theravada
Southern, Eastern and Northern Buddhism (Tāmraśāṭīya is sometimes thought of as the "Southern transmission" or "Southern Buddhism")

Further reading
Cousins, Lance (2001), On the Vibhajjavādins, Buddhist Studies Review 18 (2), 131-182

Citations 

Buddhism in Sri Lanka
Nikaya schools
Early Buddhist schools
Theravada